Existential nihilism is the philosophical theory that life has no intrinsic meaning or value. With respect to the universe, existential nihilism suggests that a single human or even the entire human species is insignificant, without purpose and unlikely to change in the totality of existence. According to the theory, each individual is an isolated being born into the universe, barred from knowing 'why'. The inherent meaninglessness of life is largely explored in the philosophical school of existentialism, where one can potentially create their own subjective 'meaning' or 'purpose'. Of all types of nihilism, existential nihilism has received the most literary and philosophical attention.

Meaning of life
The idea that meaning and values are without foundation is a form of nihilism, and the existential response to that idea is noting that meaning is not 'a matter of contemplative theory,' but instead, 'a consequence of engagement and commitment.'

In his essay Existentialism is a Humanism, Jean-Paul Sartre wrote "What do we mean by saying that existence precedes essence? We mean that man first of all exists, encounters himself, surges up in the world – and defines himself afterwards. If man as the existentialist sees him is not definable, it is because to begin with he is nothing. He will not be anything until later, and then he will be what he makes of himself." Here it is made clear what is meant by Existentialists when they say meaning is "a consequence of engagement and commitment".

The theory purports to describe the human situation to create a life outlook and create meaning, which has been summarized as, "Strut, fret, and delude ourselves as we may, our lives are of no significance, and it is futile to seek or to affirm meaning where none can be found." Existential nihilists claim that, to be honest, one must face the absurdity of existence, that they will eventually die, and that both religion and metaphysics are simply results of the fear of death.

According to Donald A. Crosby, "There is no justification for life, but also no reason not to live. Those who claim to find meaning in their lives are either dishonest or deluded. In either case, they fail to face up to the harsh reality of the human situations."

History
Existential nihilism has been a part of the Western intellectual tradition since the Cyrenaics, such as Hegesias of Cyrene. During the Renaissance, William Shakespeare eloquently summarised the existential nihilist's perspective through Macbeth's mindset in the end of the eponymous play. Arthur Schopenhauer, Søren Kierkegaard and Friedrich Nietzsche further expanded on these ideas, and Nietzsche, particularly, has become a major figure in existential nihilism.

The atheistic existentialist movement spread in 1940s France. Jean-Paul Sartre's Being and Nothingness and Albert Camus' The Myth of Sisyphus discussed the topic. Camus wrote further works, such as The Stranger, Caligula, The Plague, The Fall and The Rebel. Other figures include Martin Heidegger and Jacques Derrida. In addition, Ernest Becker's Pulitzer Prize-winning life's work The Denial of Death is a collection of thoughts on existential nihilism.

See also

Absurdism
Cosmicism
Dysteleology
Existence precedes essence
Logotherapy
Man's Search for Meaning
Meaning (existential)
Meaning of life
Philosophical pessimism

References

Nihilism
Philosophy of life
Types of existentialism